A suikerboon (Dutch), or sugar bean, is a type of sweet traditionally given on the occasion of the birth or baptism of a child in Belgium, where they are also known as doopsuiker (Dutch), or baptism sugar, and parts of the Netherlands. In French, they are called dragées. They resemble Jordan almonds and Italian Confetti.

Originally sugar-coated almonds, they are now often sugar-coated chocolates of the same shape and size instead.

See also
 Beschuit met muisjes
 Dragée
 Noghl

References
 Jackie Alpers. Sprinkles!: Recipes and Ideas for Rainbowlicious Desserts. Quirk Books, 2013.

Belgian cuisine
Dutch words and phrases
Sugar confectionery
Almond dishes